Christian Thune Jacobsen (also known as Christian Thune-Jacobsen, Christian Thune) is a Danish curler and curling coach.

At the national level he is a two-time Danish men's champion curler (1984, 1991) and a two-time Danish men's champion curler (1989, 1990).

Teams

Men's

Mixed

Record as a coach of national teams

References

External links
 
 Derfor fejer man med kost i curling | Naturvidenskab | DR (look at: "... siger fysikeren Christian Thune Jacobsen.")

Living people
Danish male curlers
Danish curling champions
Year of birth missing (living people)
Place of birth missing (living people)
Danish curling coaches